RYR, RyR or Ryr may refer to

Robert Yates Racing, a NASCAR NEXTEL Cup and Busch Series racing team
Ryanodine receptor, a class of intracellular calcium channels
RYR, the ICAO code for Ryanair, an Irish low cost airline
RYR, the National Rail code for Ryde St John's Road railway station on the Isle of Wight, UK

See also